The 2001 Saskatchewan Roughriders finished in 4th place in the West Division with a 6–12 record and missed the playoffs for the fourth year in a row.

Offseason

CFL draft

Preseason

Regular season

Season standings

Season schedule

Roster

Awards and records

CFL All-Star Selections
None

Western All-Star Selections
Darren Davis, Running Back
Eddie Davis, Defensive Back
Andrew Greene, Offensive Guard
Omarr Morgan, Cornerback
Shont'e Peoples, Defensive End
George White, Linebacker

Milestones

References

Saskatchewan Roughriders
Saskatchewan Roughriders seasons